Maya Kannadi is a 2007 Indian Tamil-language drama film directed by Cheran and produced by Subbu Panchu. Cheran also plays the lead role with Navya Nair. Ilayaraaja scores the music and Sarath Kumar, Arya and Malavika make cameo appearances in the film.

Plot

Kumar (Cheran) is a young man who comes from Thiruvannamalai to Chennai with dreams and hopes about the future. He gets a job in a men's beauty parlor in Chennai. Every day, he observes and learns more about life in the city. He starts to dream and build castles in the air.

Maheswari (Navya Nair) works in another beauty parlor and also has desires of her own.

The rest of the story is about what happens to these two people. This three hour-long film has similar themes compared to Cheran's previous films. The key message in this movie is that each person's life is in his or her own hands.

Cast

Cameo appearances

Soundtrack
Soundtrack was composed by Ilaiyaraaja.

Reception
Rediff wrote "A brave film indeed for not resorting to the usual cliches and daring to go where very few filmmakers dare to go -- the ordinary realm of the despondency of the common man." Sify wrote "We wish Cheran had whipped up a more winsome screenplay with Mayakannadi, which is based on middle class dreams turning sour due to lack of commitment. It's nowhere in the league of the talented director's previous works like Autograph or Thavamai Thavamirunthu." Behindwoods wrote "Mayakannadi is by no means a mediocre movie. But it certainly falls short of the high standards that Cheran has set for himself. It makes you think but fails to touch. That is the difference between just another movie and a great movie."

References

External links
 

Films scored by Ilaiyaraaja
2007 films
Films directed by Cheran
2000s Tamil-language films
Indian drama films